Martin Leonard Brill (born 7 April 1956) is a New Zealand former fencer, trained in France as a Maître d'armes. He competed in the individual épée events at the 1984 and 1988 Summer Olympics. He came 15th in the 1984 and 7th at the 1988 Summer Olympics. He now lives in Christchurch, New Zealand, where he is president of the Regional Fencing Committee Mid-South.

References

External links
 

1956 births
Living people
New Zealand male épée fencers
Olympic fencers of New Zealand
Fencers at the 1984 Summer Olympics
Fencers at the 1988 Summer Olympics
Sportspeople from Stoke-on-Trent
British emigrants to New Zealand
20th-century New Zealand people
21st-century New Zealand people